Sir George Donald Alastair MacDougall,  (26 October 1912 – 22 March 2004) was a Scottish economist and civil servant who influenced UK public policy during the 1960s. He headed the Government Economic Service and, between 1969 and 1973, acted as chief economic adviser to Chancellors of the Exchequer Roy Jenkins, Iain MacLeod and Anthony Barber. He predicted in about 2000 that the euro currency could not work and that the EU Stability and Growth Pact would not be enforced.

MacDougall was born in Glasgow in 1912, the son of a family with a china business, and was educated at Kelvinside Academy, Shrewsbury School and Balliol College, Oxford.

References

External links
 MacDougall, Sir (George) Donald Alastair Oxford Dictionary of National Biography
The Papers of Sir Donald MacDougall held at Churchill Archives Centre

1912 births
2004 deaths
Civil servants from Glasgow
Scottish economists
Chief Economic Advisers to HM Treasury
People educated at Kelvinside Academy
People educated at Shrewsbury School
Alumni of Balliol College, Oxford
Fellows of Nuffield College, Oxford
Fellows of Wadham College, Oxford
Knights Bachelor
Commanders of the Order of the British Empire
Fellows of the British Academy
20th-century British civil servants